Se avessi un cuore is the fifth solo studio album of the Italian singer-songwriter Annalisa, published on 20 May 2016 by label Warner Music Italy.

Background 
Se avessi un cuore consists of 12 tracks; the album is different from her previous albums, using many elements from electronic music. In addition, according to the interview with RadioItalia, Annalisa declared: "Se avessi un cuore is the album that I always wanted to do".

Receptions 

Se avessi un cuore debuted at the 4th position of the FIMI Albums Chart.

Track listing

Credits and personnel 
 Annalisa - lead vocals, backing vocals
 Luca Chiaravalli - piano, keyboards, bass guitar, electric guitar, programming
 Andrea Bonomo - acoustic guitar
 Donato Romano - synthesizer, programming
 Fabrizio Ferraguzzo - bass guitar, electric guitar, lap steel guitar, synthesizer, programming
 Davide Simonetta - keyboards, bass guitar, electric guitar
 Gianmarco Manilardi - programming
 Emiliano Bassi - drums, bass guitar, keyboards, programming
 Gadi Sasoon - synthesizer, programming
 Riccardo "Deepa" Di Paola - piano, Fender Rhodes, synthesizer, clavinet, drum machine
 Antonio Filippelli - synthesizer
 Lapo Consortini - electric guitar
 Diego Calvetti - synthesizer, piano, programming
 Mace - synthesizer, programming
 First Violin - Angela Savi, Claudia Rizzitelli, Angela Tomei
 Second Violin - Maria Landolfa, Natalia Kuleshova, Roberta Malavolti
 Cello - Diana Muenter, Laura Gorkoff

Charts

References

Annalisa albums
2016 albums